Events from the year 1184 in Ireland.

Incumbent
Lord: John

Events
The castle which gave Newcastle, County Wicklow its name was completed. It was built on an earlier Irish fortification in the territory of the O'Byrne's by the Norman Hugh de Lacy, then governor of Ireland under Henry II .
Clones Abbey was destroyed by fire.

Births

Deaths

References